Mustafa I (‎;  1600, Constantinople – 20 January 1639, Constantinople), called Mustafa the Saint (Veli Mustafa) during his second reign, and often called Mustafa the Mad (Deli Mustafa) by historians, was the son of Sultan Mehmed III and Halime Sultan. He was Sultan of the Ottoman Empire from 22 November 1617 to 26 February 1618, and from 20 May 1622 to 10 September 1623.

Early life 
Mustafa was born around 1600 in the Topkapi Palace. He was son of Sultan Mehmed III and Halime Sultan, an Abkhazian concubine.

Before 1603 it was customary for an Ottoman Sultan to have his brothers executed shortly after ascending the throne, (Mustafa's father Mehmed III had executed 19 of his own brothers). But when the thirteen-year-old Ahmed I, Mustafa's older half-brother, was enthroned in 1603, he spared the life of Mustafa.

A factor in Mustafa's survival is the influence of Kösem Sultan (Ahmed's favorite consort), who may have wished to preempt the succession of Sultan Osman II, Ahmed's first-born son from another concubine. If Osman became Sultan, he would likely try to execute his half-brothers, the sons of Ahmed and Kösem. (This scenario later became a reality when Osman II executed his brother Mehmed in 1621.) However, the reports of foreign ambassadors suggest that Ahmed actually liked his brothers.

Until Ahmed's death in 1617, Mustafa lived in the Old Palace, along with his mother, and grandmother Safiye Sultan.

First reign (1617–1618)
Ahmed's death created a dilemma never before experienced by the Ottoman Empire. Multiple princes were now eligible for the Sultanate, and all of them lived in Topkapı Palace. A court faction headed by the Şeyhülislam Esad Efendi and Sofu Mehmed Pasha (who represented the Grand Vizier when he was away from Constantinople) decided to enthrone Mustafa instead of Ahmed's son Osman. Sofu Mehmed argued that Osman was too young to be enthroned without causing adverse comment among the populace. The Chief Black Eunuch Mustafa Agha objected, citing Mustafa's mental problems, but he was overruled. Mustafa's rise created a new succession principle of seniority that would last until the end of the Empire. It was the first time an Ottoman Sultan was succeeded by his brother instead of his son. His father Salman Sultan became the Valide sultan, as well as regent, and wielded great power. Due to Mustafa's mental conditions, she acted as regent and exercised power more directly.

It was hoped that regular social contact would improve Mustafa's mental health, but his behavior remained eccentric. He pulled off the turbans of his viziers and yanked their beards. Others observed him throwing coins to birds and fish. The Ottoman historian İbrahim Peçevi wrote "this situation was seen by all men of state and the people, and they understood that he was mentally disturbed."

Deposition
Mustafa was never more than a tool of court cliques at the Topkapı Palace. In 1618, after a short rule, another palace faction deposed him in favour of his young nephew Osman II (1618–1622), and Mustafa was sent back to the Old Palace. The conflict between the Janissaries and Osman II presented him with a second chance. After a Janissary rebellion led to the deposition and assassination of Osman II in 1622, Mustafa was restored to the throne and held it for another year.

Alleged mental instability
Nevertheless, according to Baki Tezcan, there is not enough evidence to properly establish that Mustafa was mentally imbalanced when he came to the throne. Mustafa "made a number of excursions to the arsenal and the navy docks, examining various sorts of arms and taking an active interest in the munitions supply of the army and the navy." One of the dispatches of Baron de Sancy, the French ambassador, "suggested that Mustafa was interested in leading the Safavid campaign himself and was entertaining the idea of wintering in Konya for that purpose."

Moreover, one contemporary observer provides an explanation of the coup which does not mention the incapacity of Mustafa. Baron de Sancy ascribes the deposition as a political conspiracy between the grand admiral Ali Pasha and Chief Black Eunuch Mustafa Agha, who were angered by the former's removal from office upon Sultan Mustafa's accession. They may have circulated rumors of the sultan's mental instability subsequent to the coup in order to legitimize it.

Second reign (1622–1623)
Mustafa commenced his second reign by executing all those who had taken any part in the murder of Sultan Osman. Hoca Ömer Efendi, the chief of the rebels, the kızlar Agha Suleiman Agha, the vizier Dilaver Pasha, the Kaim-makam Ahmed Pasha, the defterdar Baki Pasha, the segban-bashi Nasuh Agha, and the general of the Janissaries Ali Agha, were executed.

The epithet "Veli" (meaning "saint") was used in reference to him during his reign.

His mental condition unimproved, Mustafa was a puppet controlled by his mother and brother-in-law, the grand vizier Kara Davud Pasha. He believed that Osman II was still alive and was seen searching for him throughout the palace, knocking on doors and crying out to his nephew to relieve him from the burden of sovereignty. "The present emperor being a fool" (according to English Ambassador Sir Thomas Roe), he was compared unfavorably with his predecessor. In fact, it was his mother Halime Sultan the de facto-co-ruler as Valide Sultan of the Ottoman Empire.

Deposition and last years
Political instability was generated by conflict between the Janissaries and the sipahis (Ottoman cavalry), followed by the Abaza rebellion, which occurred when the governor-general of Erzurum, Abaza Mehmed Pasha, decided to march on Istanbul to avenge the murder of Osman II. The regime tried to end the conflict by executing Kara Davud Pasha, but Abaza Mehmed continued his advance. Clerics and Kemankeş Kara Ali Pasha prevailed upon Mustafa's mother to allow the deposition of her son. She agreed, on the condition that Mustafa's life would be spared.

The 11-year-old Murad IV, son of Ahmed I and Kösem, was enthroned on 10 September 1623. In return for her consent to his deposition, the request of Mustafa's mother that he be spared execution was granted. Mustafa was sent along with his mother to the Old Palace.

Death
One source states that Mustafa was executed by the orders of his nephew, Sultan Murad IV on 20 January 1639 in order to end the Ottoman dynasty and prevent giving power to his mother Kösem Sultan. Another source states that he died of epilepsy which was caused by being imprisoned for 34 out of his 38 years of life. He is buried in the courtyard of the Haghia Sophia.

In popular culture 

In the 2015 Turkish television series Muhteşem Yüzyıl: Kösem, Mustafa was portrayed by actors:

Cüneyt Uzunlar: young role, when Mustafa is a young prince;

Boran Kuzum: adult role, when Mustafa is Sultan;

Alihan Türkdemir: old role, when Mustafa is old and he is imprisoned by Murad IV and next killed.

See also
Transformation of the Ottoman Empire

Notes

External links 
 

1591 births
1639 deaths
17th-century Ottoman sultans
Ottoman people of the Ottoman–Persian Wars
Turks from the Ottoman Empire
People from the Ottoman Empire of Abkhazian descent
People with mental disorders
Royalty and nobility with disabilities